Bara is a 1982 Kannada film directed and produced by M. S. Sathyu. It is based on the novel of same name by U. R. Ananthamurthy. The film starred Anant Nag, C. R. Simha and Loveleen Madhu in lead roles. The film won many laurels upon release including the National Film Award for Best Feature Film in Kannada for its script of an incisive analysis of the socio-political situation in a drought affected district. The film went on floors in 1980 and made its theatrical release in 1982. The Hindi version of the film Sookha was released in 1983. However, unlike the Kannada version, the film could not get a theatrical release, and was shown on Doordarshan.

Cast
 Anant Nag as Collector Satish Chandra
 C. R. Simha as Bhimoji
 Uma Shivakumar as Bhimoji's wife 
 Loveleen Madhu as Satish Chandra's wife 
 Veeraj Byakod as Satish Chandra's son
 Shivaram
 Nitin Sethi
 M. V. Narayana Rao
 Pankaj Dheer
 Vaijanath Biradar

Soundtrack
The music was composed by Mysore Ananthaswamy and Siddalingaiah with lyrics by K. S. Nissar Ahmed and Siddalingaiah.

Awards
 National Film Award for Best Feature Film in Kannada - 1981
 Karnataka State Film Award for Best Film - 1981-82

Filmfare Awards Kannada

 Best Film - Bara (1982)
 Best Director - M. S. Sathyu (1982)
 Best Actor - Anant Nag (1982)

References

External links
 

1980 films
1980s Kannada-language films
Films based on short fiction
Films directed by M. S. Sathyu
Best Kannada Feature Film National Film Award winners